is a passenger railway station in located in the city of Yao, Osaka Prefecture, Japan, operated by West Japan Railway Company (JR West).

Lines

Station layout
The station consists of two opposed side platforms connected by an elevated station building. The station has a Midori no Madoguchi staffed ticket office.

Platforms

History 
Yao station opened on 14 May 1889. With the privatization of Japanese National Railways (JNR) on 1 April 1987, the station came under the control of JR West.

Station numbering was introduced in March 2018 with Yao being assigned station number JR-Q25.

Passenger statistics
In fiscal 2019, the station was used by an average of 13,165 passengers daily (boarding passengers only).

Surrounding Area
 YYao City Anchu Elementary School
 Yao Municipal Seiho Junior High School
 Osaka Prefectural Yao High School

See also
List of railway stations in Japan

References

External links

 Yao Station Official Site

Railway stations in Osaka Prefecture
Stations of West Japan Railway Company
Railway stations in Japan opened in 1889
Yao, Osaka